Anahuac is the ancient core of Mexico. Anahuac is a Nahuatl name which means "close to water." Anahuac is sometimes used interchangeably with "Valley of Mexico", but Anahuac properly designates the south-central part of the  valley, where well-developed pre-Hispanic culture traits had created distinctive landscapes now hidden by the urban sprawl of Mexico City. In the sense of modern geomorphological terminology, "Valley of Mexico" is misnamed.

Boundaries
According to the Encyclopædia Britannica Eleventh Edition, Anáhuac (sic) is "limited by the traditional and vaguely defined boundaries of an ancient American empire or confederation of that name previous to the Spanish conquest."

The first two explanations would have a bearing on the above issue of the borders.

References

Sources

 
 
 
 
 
 
  

Geography of Mesoamerica
History of Mesoamerica